Turkey as the host nation of the 2017 Summer Deaflympics competed in the event fielding 287 athletes. Turkey finished on 4th in the Medal list after winning 46 medals including 17 gold medals; this was also the occasion where Turkey won the highest number of medals in a single Deaflympics event.

Medal table

Football 

Turkey Men's Deaf national football team competed in the football event as the host nation. Turkey won all 3 matches they played against Saudi Arabia, Egypt and Venezuela in the Group stage. Turkey defeated Ukraine in the finals 4–3 to claim the gold medal for the first time in Deaflympic football.

Final

Handball 
Turkey went onto participate at the handball event and created history after clinching the gold medal in the Men's Handball event for the very first time beating Russia in the finals.

Volleyball 

Turkey Men's Deaf Volleyball team participated at the Volleyball event and clinched gold medal by defeating Ukraine in the finals 3–0. In the Women's volleyball tournament Turkey Women's Deaf Volleyball team finished 7th.

Taekwondo 

Turkey had a great success in the Taekwondo events after finishing strongly with a medal haul of 15 medals including 6 gold medals. 
 Yenigun Elif - 
 Savan Aslihan - , 
 Gokkaya Ayse Gul - 
 Karaca Ali - , 
 Yazici Merve - 
 Seker Selver - 
 Caliskan Zeki - 
 Atamer Ibrahim - , 
 Guler Muhammad - 
 Simsek Batuhan - 
 Gecit Osman -

References

External links
Turkey at the Deaflympics

2017 in Turkish sport
Turkey at the Deaflympics
Nations at the 2017 Summer Deaflympics